The Holy Trinity Church is a church in the city of Kamianets-Podilskyi, Khmelnytskyi Oblast (province) of western Ukraine. The church is situated on  Trinity Square near the entrance to the historic Old Town neighborhood of Kamianets-Podilskyi.

Written documents date the Holy Trinity Church back to 1582, although archaeologists have found evidence that the church might even date back to the 14th century. After the Turkish seizure of Kamianets in 1672, the Holy Trinity Church, along with other Orthodox churches in the area, was converted into a Muslim mosque. It remained a mosque until 1699 when it was transferred over to the Uniates when the entire region of Podolia returned to Polish control. The church was one of the oldest in the city and the surrounding region, until its destruction by the Soviets in 1935.

After Ukrainian independence in 1991, the square upon which it sits was renamed from Kuibyshev Square to Trinity Square. In 2006, restoration work commenced, being completed in 2008. On July 10, 2010, the church was consecrated by Vasyl Semeniuk, the eparch of Ternopil – Zboriv of the Ukrainian Greek Catholic Church.

Architecturally, the Holy Trinity Church resembles two other 16th-century Kamianets-Podilskyi churches, the Church of Ss. Peter and Paul, and the Ioanno-Predtechynska Church. It is an oval-shaped construction, with an altar at the east, and a choir room at the south; the church's western portion features a bell tower.

References

Buildings and structures completed in 1582
16th-century churches
Churches completed in 2008
Buildings and structures in Kamianets-Podilskyi
Ukrainian Catholic churches in Ukraine
Tourist attractions in Khmelnytskyi Oblast